Enchelycore lichenosa is a moray eel found in coral reefs around Taiwan, southern Japan, and the Galapagos Islands. It was first named by Jordan and Snyder in 1901, and is commonly known as the reticulate hookjaw moray. To respirate, the eel constantly opens and closes its mouth.

References

External links
 

lichenosa
Fish described in 1901
Taxa named by David Starr Jordan